Orazio Antonio Bologna (born 8 June 1945) is an Italian classical philologist, and poet writing in Latin.

Biography 
Bologna was born in Pago Veiano. He studied at the University of Naples Federico II and graduated in 1975 with title of doctor. Several years later, Bologna graduated from the Pontifical Superior Institute for Latin (Latin: Pontificium Institutum Altioris Latinitatis).

From 1975 to 2010 Bologna was teaching Latin and Greek in various Roman high schools, the last one being Giulio Cesare Classical High School. Since 2001 he has been a Professor of Latin composition, and Latin as well as Green literature and metric at the Salesian Pontifical University in Rome. Having retired, Bologna continues to work as a researcher, writer, poet and orator. 

Bologna is a member of the Pontifical Academy for Latin and Academia Latinitati Fovendae. He is a Vice President of the Collectanea Philologica periodical published at the University of Lodz, Poland, and Certamen Apollinare Poeticum issued at the same university. He is a Jury President of a Poetry Competition in Italian and Latin metric – Modernità in metrica – at Associazione Culturale e Theatrale Mimesis. Lastly, Bologna is a President of Laurea Apollinaris Poetica competition at the Salesian Pontifical University that awarded him the title of the best Italian poet.

Publications 
In 1975 he published Archiloco, Poggobonsi 

In 2010 he published Manfredi tra scomunica e redenzione, Sentieri Meridiani, Foggia 

In 2013 he published Manfredi di Svevia. Impero e Papato nella concezione di Dante, LAS, Rome 

In 2014 he published Pontifici sit Musa dicata Pio, Rome 

In 2017 he published Gonzagide, an epic poem in 4 books (15th century), Viella, Rome  – the volume received an honourable mention from Istituto di Studi Romani in 2019. 

In 2018 he published Alle falde d'Elicona. Influssi mesopotamici sui miti greci, IF Press, Rome 

In 2019 he published Dizionario pajàno-italiano, Rome 

In 2020 he published Dialetto di Pago Veiano - Grammatica normativa; Fergen; 

In 2021 he published Dialetto di Pago Veiano - Lessico ortoepico e ortografico con cenni di vita e costumanze locali; Fergen, 

In 2021 he published La Divina Commedia - Le terzine più famose, Fergen; 

In 2021 he published Dal Corano alla Divina Commedia; Diarkos 

In 2022 he published Carmina Latina - Vita poesi dicata; Viella 

His Latin and Italian works are also published in:

 Archivum Anatolicum, Ankara University
 Sallesianum, Salesian Pontifical University
 Collectanea Philologica, University of Lodz
 Latinitas, old and new series
 Vox Latina
 Supplementa Humanistica Lovaniensia
 Some of his poems are also collected in Modern Latin Poetry – Poematia Moderna

References 

Living people
University of Naples Federico II alumni
People from the Province of Benevento
Italian male poets
1945 births
20th-century Italian poets
Italian classical philologists